Randi Hutter Epstein is a medical writer, author and journalist, has written for publications such as New York Times, and The Washington Post. She is also a lecturer at Yale University, a writer-in-residence at the Yale School of Medicine and an adjunct professor at Columbia University's Journalism School.

Epstein has worked as a medical writer for the London bureau of The Associated Press and was the London bureau chief of Physicians' Weekly. Her articles have also appeared in The Daily Telegraph, The Guardian, Parents, More, among other newspapers and magazines.

Education
Epstein earned a B.S. from The University of Pennsylvania where she studied the history and sociology of science.  She earned an M.S. from the Columbia University School of Journalism, an M.D. from Yale University School of Medicine, and an M.P.H. from the Columbia University Mailman School of Public Health.

Books
Epstein is the author of Aroused: The History of Hormones and How They Control Just About Everything (released by W. W. Norton, June 2018) and Get Me Out: A History of Childbirth from the Garden of Eden to the Sperm Bank (released by W. W. Norton, Jan 2010).

References

External links

Articles
 Cases: So Lucky to Have Given Birth in England, New York Times — Dec. 4, 2001
 ESSAY; Questioning the 'Deadline' for Weaning, New York Times — Sept. 21, 1999
  The Novice: Hardly out of Diapers and Now Into Yoga, New York Times — June 15, 1999
  Richard Selzer, Who Fictionalized Medicine's Absurdity and Gore, Dies at 87, New York Times — June 15, 2016
 Howard W. Jones Jr., a Pioneer of Reproductive Medicine, Dies at 104, New York Times —  July 31, 2015, Page A1
  You Don't Actually Have Cancer, Daily Beast, July 13, 2013

American women journalists
Medical journalists
Living people
Columbia University Graduate School of Journalism faculty
1962 births
21st-century American women